Dara James Morgan Costelloe (born 11 December 2002) is an Irish footballer who plays for Bradford City, on loan from Burnley as a forward.

Career
Costelloe was born in Limerick, County Limerick and was a part of the youth team at Aisling Annacotty before joining Galway United under-15 side in 2017. He made his first team debut for Galway a year later on 31 August 2018, aged 15, when he came on as a substitute in the 2–0 defeat to Finn Harps. This broke the record for the youngest every player to play for the first team. A day later he signed a First Team contract having impressed for manager, Alan Murphy's, under-17 side.

In February 2021, it was announced that Costelloe had signed a contract for Premier League side Burnley having trained and featured for the under-18 and under-23 setups since the previous summer. He signed a deal with Steve Stone's Academy side until June 2022. After two successful campaigns in the Academy, he signed a new contract with Burnley in the summer of 2022. He finished as top scorer for the under-23 side with twelve goals and also made the bench for the first team for the last seven games of the Premier League season as Burnley were relegated.

Costelloe made his first team debut on 29 July 2022, starting the first league game of the season in a 1–0 win over Huddersfield Town at the Kirklees Stadium. It was also Vincent Kompany's managerial debut for the Clarets.

On 13 January 2023, Costelloe joined EFL League Two side Bradford City on loan for the remainder of the 2022-23 season.

Career statistics

Notes

References

 

2002 births
Living people
Republic of Ireland association footballers
Association football forwards
Sportspeople from Limerick (city)
Galway United F.C. players
Burnley F.C. players
Bradford City A.F.C. players
League of Ireland players
English Football League players
Republic of Ireland expatriate association footballers
Irish expatriate sportspeople in England
Expatriate footballers in England